Herzblut (English: heart and soul) may refer to:

Herzblut (Doro EP), 2008
Herzblut (Subway to Sally album), 2001